Jeanne Valérie (19 August 1941 – 25 September 2020) was a French film and television actress.

Selected filmography

 Cigarettes, Whiskey and Wild Women (1959)
 Web of Passion (1959)
 The Loves of Salammbo (1960)
 Call Girls of Rome (1960)
 Labbra rosse (1960)
 Le pillole di Ercole (1960)
 From a Roman Balcony (1960)
 Green Harvest (1961)
 The Mishap (1961)
 The Game of Truth (1961)
 Adorable Julia (1962)
 Mandrin (1962)
 The Bread Peddler (1963)
 Let's Talk About Women (1964)
 White Voices (1964)
 Nick Carter and Red Club (1965)
 Espionage in Lisbon (1965)
 No Diamonds for Ursula (1967)
 Desert Commandos (1968)
 The Skin (1981)
 Husband and Lovers (1991)

References

Bibliography
 Janis L. Pallister & Ruth A. Hottell. Noteworthy Francophone Women Directors: A Sequel. Lexington Books, 2011.

External links

1941 births
2020 deaths
French film actresses
French television actresses
Actresses from Paris